"Most of All" is a B. J. Thomas single from the 1970 album, Most of All, on Scepter Records.  The song, composed by Buddy Buie and J.R. Cobb (Classics IV, Atlanta Rhythm Section), reached #2 on the Billboard Adult Contemporary singles chart, and #38 on the Billboard Hot 100, in the same year.  The song was also a hit in Canada, reaching the Top 20 on both corresponding charts.

History 
The song has been republished on many of Thomas' albums and greatest hits compilations, including a calypso arranged duo with Keb' Mo' on The Living Room Sessions (2013).

 B. J. Thomas has also recorded a different song with the same title, "Most of All" (1955), written by Alan Freed, Harvey Fuqua and Hank Thompson.

Other versions
The Osmonds released a version of the song on their 1970 album, Osmonds.

Anne Murray recorded it for her 1971 album "Talk It Over In The Morning".

References

External links 
  
 

1970 songs
1970 singles
Songs written by Buddy Buie
Songs written by J. R. Cobb
B. J. Thomas songs
The Osmonds songs
Scepter Records singles